Elena Puidokaitė (better known by her stage name Atlanta; born 5 April 1981) was a Lithuanian pop singer. She made her debut in 1998, when the music manager Martynas Tyla offered her to join the new band "Cushions". Their most successful hit "Winter" was recorded with Atlanta.

Atlanta's first two solo's, "Never" and new version of Lemon Joy song "White City" were recorded in “Zymozek Sonic” studio with Algis Drėma's help. Also that group singer Igoris Kofas created the first hit "And Girls want to love" music.

Atlanta debuted with album “Girls want to love” in August 2001. She created a new version of old song "Swallows, swallows" with Andrius Mamontovas, when the second album "The wind told me" has just appeared.

Musical activity

Albums
 2001:  "Girls want to love"
 2003:  "The wind told me"
 2005:  "Heart"
 2007:

Radio singles
 2001:  "Friends"
 2001:  "Girls want to love"
 2001:  "I like to live like that"
 2002:  (with Stano)
 2002: 
 2002: 
 2002: 
 2002: 
 2003:  (with Andrius Mamontovas)
 2004: Me And My Girls
 2005: Pas(si)lik
 2005: 
 2005: 
 2005: 
 2006: 
 2006:

Awards
Radiocentras musical awards for the best song.

References

External links
 Official website of Atlanta

Women rock singers
Lithuanian pop singers
21st-century Lithuanian women singers
Living people
1981 births